is a Japanese footballer currently playing as a midfielder for FC Tokyo as a designated special player.

Career statistics

Club
.

Notes

References

2004 births
Living people
Japanese footballers
Association football midfielders
FC Tokyo players